Elections to the 8th Odisha Legislative Assembly were held 1980.

Constituencies
The elections were held for 147 constituencies, of which 22 were reserved for Scheduled Castes, 34 for Scheduled Tribes and 91 unreserved.

Contesting parties
There are eight national parties CPI, INC(I), INC(U), BJP, JNP, CPM, JNP(SC) and JNP(SR), Two stateparties FBL and RSP two registered unrecognised party JKD and SUC and some Independent Politiciantook part in this assembly election. Indian National Congress (I) emerged as the winner by winning 118  seats. Janaki Ballabh Patnaik become the Chief Minister and Sarat Deb become the Leader of Opposition in the 8th Orissa Assembly.

Results

!colspan=10|
|- style="background-color:#E9E9E9; text-align:center;"
! class="unsortable" |
! Political Party !! Flag !! Seats  Contested !! Won !! Net Change  in seats !! % of  Seats
! Votes !! Vote % !! Change in vote %
|- style="background: #90EE90;"
| 
| style="text-align:left;" |Indian National Congress (I)
| 
| 147 || 118 || "NEW" || 80.27 || 30,37,487 || 47.78 || "NEW"
|-
|
| style="text-align:left;" |Indian National Congress (U)
|
| 98 || 2 || "NEW" || 1.36 || 4,46,818 || 10.49 || "NEW"
|-
| 
| style="text-align:left;" |Bharatiya Janata Party
|
| 28 || 0 || NA || 0|| 86,421 || 7.09 || NA
|-
| 
| style="text-align:left;" |Communist Party of India
| 
| 27 || 4 ||  0|| 3.57 || 2,33,971 || 2.72 ||  3.4
|-
| 
|
| 248 || 7 || N/A || 4.76 || 7,55,087 || 15.77 || N/A
|- class="unsortable" style="background-color:#E9E9E9"
! colspan = 3|
! style="text-align:center;" |Total Seats !! 147 !! style="text-align:center;" |Voters !! 1,39,09,115 !! style="text-align:center;" |Turnout !! colspan = 2|65,49,074 (47.08%)
|}

Elected members

References

Odisha Legislative Assembly
State Assembly elections in Odisha
Odisha